Let's Get Wet is Raymond Lam's third album, released on 16 June 2009. It contains 7 tracks and 3 music videos.

The title of this album has been used by Wong Cho Lam as a running gag during his concert with Raymond Lam as a guest.

Track listing

CD

DVD

External links
http://bbs.raymondforest.com/read.php?tid=40694

References

2008 albums
Raymond Lam albums